The Barkly Tableland is  a rolling plain of grassland in Australia. It  runs from the eastern part of the Northern Territory into western Queensland. The Barkly Tableland runs parallel to the southern shore of the Gulf of Carpentaria, from about Mount Isa, Queensland to near Daly Waters.

History
William Landsborough was the first non-Indigenous Australian person to explore the tableland, and named it after Sir Henry Barkly, then governor of Victoria.

In 1877 the overlander, Nathaniel Buchanan and Sam Croker crossed the Barkly Tableland and rode on to the Overland Telegraph Line opening new land for settlement. It was not until the introduction of generous leasing arrangements on the Barkly in the late 1870s that the region became more settled.

In 1883, Harry Readford, one of the inspirations for the literary character Captain Starlight, drove a mob of cattle to the Barkly and subsequently established Brunette Downs (then called Corella Creek), with outstations at Anthony Lagoon and Cresswell Creek, for Macdonald, Smith and Co. In 1884, 2,500 cattle were driven to Brunette Downs and in 1885, Readford brought in 1,200 mixed cattle from Burketown. Other cattle stations in the area include Alexandria, Mittiebah and Walhallow.

Geography

The Barkly Tableland rises to more than 300 metres (1,000 feet) near the Queensland and Northern Territory border. Black soil plains cover much of the Barkly Tableland. Rainfall in this inland area is low (350mm per year) and subject to extreme seasonal fluctuations with rains occurring from November to March during the hot (up to 40 °C) summer. Winters are cool and frost may occur, especially in the southern section of the plain in Queensland.

The Barkly Tableland is a distinct physiographic province of the larger West Australian Shield division. It includes the Mueller Plateau and Sandover-Pituri Platform physiographic sections between the desert uplands in the west and Mount Isa, Queensland in the east. The Tableland drains into the Gulf of Carpentaria via the Flinders River while the southwestern plains drain into Lake Eyre via the Diamantina River or into the Simpson Desert via the Georgina River which has its source on the Tableland. Mount Isa meanwhile is drained by the Leichardt River. Waterways on the Tableland itself are small as most water drains into the porous limestone, sometimes forming salt lakes such as Lake Buchanan in Queensland. Tarrabool Lake, the largest wooded swamp in tropical Australia, when completely filled, is located in the west of the Tablelands. Other important water sources on the downs are the artesian springs such as those of the Edgbaston Reserve.

The Barkly region, with a population of just over 5,900 people, has the lowest population of any region in the Northern Territory. Most live in the main town of Tennant Creek. Barkly has a diverse economy including agriculture, fishing, and defence but the main source of income is cattle ranching as the area includes some of the best beef cattle grazing country in Australia. 

Some of the very large cattle stations located on the Tableland include Alexandria Station, Alroy Downs, Anthony Lagoon, Austral Downs, Avon Downs, Banka Banka, Brunette Downs, Creswell Downs, Eva Downs, Helen Springs, Newcastle Waters and Lake Nash Station.

The region attracts more than 140,000 tourists average each year.

Ecology
The dominant flora of the Tableland is semi-arid savanna of Mitchell grass. The Tableland forms the western portion of the Mitchell Grass Downs ecoregion, which covers an area running 1500 km from here southeast into the Channel Country of Queensland. The Carpentaria tropical savanna ecoregion lies to the north in the lowlands around the Gulf of Carpentaria. The Victoria Plains tropical savanna lies to the west. The central Australian desert lies south of these savannas and grasslands. The grasslands are mostly used for cattle grazing and are home to some threatened species of plants and animals. The higher areas of Mount Isa and the Selwyn Range, known as the Mount Isa Inlier, have their own unique wildlife.

Biogeographic Region
The Mitchell Grass Downs bioregion, together with the Mount Isa Inlier and Desert Uplands bioregions, constitute the larger Mitchell Grass Downs ecoregion.

See Interim Biogeographic Regionalisation for Australia

Flora
Mitchell grass is hardy with long roots so is well adapted to dry soils and periods of drought. The grasslands support other distinctive plants alongside the grasses but there are no areas of thick woodland, only acacia trees scattered across the plain, and red river gum along watercourses.

Fauna
The habitat of the Mitchell Grass Downs is mostly a uniform cover of grassland and therefore does not support a great variety of wildlife. The few mammals include the brushtail possum (Trichosurus vulpecula) and the Alexandria false antechinus (Pseudantechinus mimulus), a small carnivorous marsupial found only in a number of small, isolated localities in northern Australia, including Alexandria Station on the Barkly Tableland. Meanwhile, the section of the Mitchell grasslands in Queensland is home to another endangered marsupial, the Julia Creek dunnart.

There are healthy populations of grassland birds such as the flock bronzewing, while the endangered night parrot has been spotted in Diamantina National Park in Queensland. The seasonal wetlands of the downs are important habitats, particularly as breeding grounds for waterbirds. These include the Lake Tarabool swamp, Lake Woods, Lake Buchanan and Lake Galilee (Queensland).

There are also many snakes and other reptiles and amphibians adapted to the clay soils that crack in the long dry season and turn to mud after the rains. These include burrowing frogs that emerge to breed in the mud and the long-haired rat which erupts in huge numbers after the monsoon and spreads across the grasslands. Endemic reptiles of the downs include  the dwarf dtella gecko (Gehyra minuta), some species of Ctenotus and Lerista skinks, an agamid lizard (Pogona henrylawsoni), and a monitor lizard (Spencer's goanna). The snakes include the Elapidae; speckled brown snake (Pseudonaja guttata), Ingram's brown snake (Pseudonaja ingrami), and Collett's snake, all of which are venomous. Insects include a number of endemic species of ant.

Threats and preservation
Some of the grassland is protected but most is pasture and although largely unspoilt, it is vulnerable to overgrazing, particularly areas of Queensland bluebush (Chenopodium auricomum). The downs are home to a number of endangered species and localised habitats that are threatened.

Protected areas that contain Mitchell grassland include Connells Lagoon Conservation Reserve in the Northern Territory. In Queensland, Astrebla Downs National Park, which is part of the national initiative to resuscitate the endangered bilby marsupial; Moorrinya National Park and Bladensburg National Park, both home to the Julia Creek dunnart; Diamantina National Park; and White Mountains National Park which contains areas of desert uplands at the western edge of the tableland. The Mount Isa area is more or less unprotected except that part of it is in Boodjamulla National Park.

References

External links
Barkly Tablelands info

Barkly Region
Biogeography of the Northern Territory
IBRA subregions
Regions of the Northern Territory
Tropical and subtropical grasslands, savannas, and shrublands